ArrangingTime is a 2016 studio album by American rock singer-songwriter Pete Yorn, released on Capitol Records.

Critical reception
The record received generally favorable reviews according to metacritic.com and was called “one of the years most engaging listens” by No Ripcord magazine.

Track listing
All songs written by Pete Yorn, except where noted
"Summer Was a Day"– 3:58
"Lost Weekend"– 4:11
"Halifax"– 2:51
"In Your Head"– 4:04
"She Was Weird"– 4:17
"I'm Not the One"– 3:35
"Shopping Mall"– 3:51
"Roses"– 3:52
"Screaming at the Setting Sun"– 2:46
"Walking Up" (Marc Dauer, Pete Yorn)– 3:15
"Tomorrow"– 3:14
"This Fire" (Darren Geare, Jeff Tucker, Yorn)– 4:04

Personnel
"Summer Was a Day"
Pete Yorn– acoustic and electric guitar, bass guitar, singing, production
Scott Seiver– drums, percussion, electric guitar, synthesizer, engineering, production at Loma Lada Studio, Los Angeles, California
Kennie Takahashi– mixing at The Living Room in Santa Clarita, California
"Lost Weekend"
Pete Yorn– guitar, synthesizer, vocals, production
Gabe Noel– bass cello
Sunny Levine– synthesizer, programming, engineering, production at Pap Pap's Palace, Venice, California
Kennie Takahashi– mixing at The Living Room in Santa Clarita, California
"Halifax"
Pete Yorn– acoustic and electric guitars, bass guitar, vocals, production
Scott Seiver– drums, bass guitar, Mellotron, tambourine, shaker, bass keyboard, Wurlitzer electric piano, engineering, production at Loma Lada Studio, Los Angeles, California
Kennie Takahashi– mixing at The Living Room in Santa Clarita, California
"In Your Head"
Pete Yorn– acoustic and electric guitars, bass guitar, drum machine, vocals, production
R. Walt Vincent– celesta, drum programming, electric guitar, Hammond B3 organ, engineering, mixing, production at Spring Street Sound, Los Angeles, California
"She Was Weird"
Pete Yorn– guitar, synthesizer, bass guitar, vocals, production
Shawn Everett– mixing at Subtle McNugget, downtown Los Angeles, California
Sunny Levine– programming, synthesizer, engineering, production at Pap Pap's Palace, Venice, California
Scott Seiver– additional editing
Amir Yaghmai– synthesizer
"I'm Not the One"
Pete Yorn– acoustic guitar, electric piano, lead and harmony vocals, production
Jeff Trott– acoustic, baritone, electric, and tenor guitars; bass guitar, drum programming, engineering, mixing, production at Atomic Halo Recording, Los Angeles, California
"Shopping Mall"
Pete Yorn– baritone guitar, keyboard bass, Rhodes electric piano, vocals, production
R. Walt Vincent– drum programming, electric guitar, synthesizer, engineering, mixing, production at Spring Street Sound, Los Angeles, California
"Roses"
Pete Yorn– acoustic and electric guitar, bass guitar, vocals, production
J. D. King– additional recording
R. Walt Vincent– hurdy gurdy, marimba, piano, Wurlitzer electric piano, tubular bells, Mellotron, string arrangement, engineering, mixing, production at Spring Street Sound, Los Angeles, California
"Screaming at the Setting Sun"
Bass, Drums, Electric Guitar, Voice, Backing Vocals – Pete Yorn– electric guitar, bass guitar, drums, backing and lead vocals, production
Drum Programming, Keyboards, Soloist [Guitar Solo], Backing Vocals – R. Walt Vincent– drum programming, guitar solo, keyboards, backing vocals, engineering, production at Spring Street Sound, Los Angeles, California
Kennie Takahashi– mixing at The Living Room in Santa Clarita, California
"Walking Up"
Pete Yorn– acoustic guitar, drums, vocals, production
Marc Dauer– bass guitar, drums, guitar, keyboards, piano, synthesizer, engineering, production at The Clinic, Los Angeles, California
R. Walt Vincent– cymbal, flute, Mellotron, additional mixing, additional production at Spring Street Sound, Los Angeles, California
"Tomorrow"
Pete Yorn– acoustic and electric guitars, Rhodes electric piano, vocals, production
R. Walt Vincent– drum programming, synthesizer, engineering, mixing, production at Spring Street Sound, Los Angeles, California
"This Fire"
Pete Yorn– electric guitar, bass guitar, piano, lead and backing vocals, production
R. Walt Vincent– drum programming, pump organ, string arrangements, backing vocals, engineering, mixing, production at Spring Street Sound, Los Angeles, California

Andy West Design– art direction
Emily Lazar– mastering at The Lodge, New York City, New York
Jim Wright– photography
Kevin Yorn– back cover photograph

References

External links

Press release from Capitol Records
A promotional set for Morning Becomes Eclectic including several of the songs from this album

2016 albums
Capitol Records albums
Pete Yorn albums
Albums produced by Jeff Trott
Albums produced by R. Walt Vincent